CGS Vigilant was a Fisheries Protection patrol vessel employed on the Canadian Great Lakes. Completed in 1904, the vessel remained in service on the Great Lakes until 1924. The vessel was then chartered by the Canadian Customs Preventive Service until 1929 for service on the East Coast of Canada. The ship was sold to private interests and converted to a barge. She remained in service until 1956 when the vessel was broken up.

Description
Vigilant, designed as an armed patrol vessel for service on the Great Lakes, was of steel construction and fitted with a ram bow. The vessel was armed with two QF 3-pounder guns.

Service history
Vigilant, described as the "first modern warship to be built in Canada", was acquired for patrol service on the Great Lakes to replace the aging . The vessel was constructed by Polson Iron Works Limited at their shipyard in Toronto and was launched on 11 September 1904, and completed later in the year.

Vigilant was sometimes described as a "third class cruiser". Vigilant was credited at the time by the Minister of Marine and Fisheries, Louis-Philippe Brodeur as being the nucleus of the future Royal Canadian Navy. Upon entering service, the crew of the vessel wore naval-style uniforms, a first for Canada. The vessel entered service in 1904 as a fisheries patrol vessel. On 7 June 1905 Vigilant collided with the  fishing steamer Grace M.  east of Middle Island in Lake Erie. Grace M sank and two of fishing vessel's crew drowned in the incident. Vigilant remained on fisheries patrol until 1924, when the vessel was sold by the Department of Marine and Fisheries.

In 1926 Vigilant was chartered by the Customs Preventive Service for East Coast patrols to counter smuggling. Between 1927 and 1929, Vigilant patrolled Nova Scotia's Atlantic coast. The vessel was later converted to a barge and was scrapped in 1956 by Steel Co. in Hamilton, Ontario.

Notes

Citations

Sources
 
 
 
 
 
 

Cruisers of the Royal Canadian Navy
Patrol vessels of the Canadian Coast Guard
1904 ships
Fishery protection vessels
Ships built in Ontario
Cruisers of Canada
Auxiliary ships of the Royal Canadian Navy
Canadian Government Ship